Milecastle 75 (Easton) was one of a series of Milecastles or small fortlets built at intervals of approximately one Roman mile along Hadrian's Wall in England.

Description
Milecastle 75 is thought to lie near the road leading from Burgh by Sands to Drumburgh. The milecastle has never been found, and its position has been estimated in reference to neighbouring wall structures. The site falls within Burgh Marsh where there are no known remains of Hadrian's Wall.

Associated turrets 
Each milecastle on Hadrian's Wall had two associated turret structures. These turrets were positioned approximately one-third and two-thirds of a Roman mile to the west of the Milecastle, and would probably have been manned by part of the milecastle's garrison. The turrets associated with Milecastle 75 are known as Turret 75A and Turret 75B. The exact locations of the turrets have not been found. Both sites fall within Burgh Marsh where there is no evidence for any Wall structures.

References

75
Roman sites in Cumbria